Kim Yu-seong (Hangul: 김유성; born 12 June 2009) is a South Korean figure skater. She is the 2023 South Korean junior champion and the 2022 Denis Ten Memorial junior silver medalist.

Personal life 
Kim was born on 12 June 2009 in Seoul. Her twin sister, Yu-jae, is a figure skater as well.

Programs

Competitive highlights

References

External links 
 

2009 births
Living people
South Korean female single skaters
Sportspeople from Seoul
Figure skaters from Seoul
Twin sportspeople
South Korean twins